Azeezia Medical College Hospital is a hospital located in Kerala. It is a 540-bed multi-specialty hospital. The hospital provides treatment in various specialties, such as medicine, surgery, obstetrics and gynecology, dermatology, psychiatry, pediatrics, orthopedics, ophthalmology, otolaryngology, anesthesiology, radiology, emergency services, and laparoscopic surgery. Super-specialty departments include cardiothoracic, neurology, nephrology, pulmonology, gastroenterology, endocrinology, and neurosurgery. The medical college includes super-specialty units and colleges for medical, dental, and nursing courses. The campus is in a rural area  from NH-47 (Kollam-Thiruvananthapuram portion).

Location
Azeezia group of medical educational institutions is situated at Meeyannoor village,  from Kollam city.

Departments
The 540-bedded multi-specialty hospital is renowned for its excellent medical expertise, nursing care, and quality diagnostic services. The hospital provides treatment in various specialties such as medicine, surgery, obstetrics & gynecology, dermatology, psychiatry, pediatrics, orthopedics, urology, ophthalmology, otolaryngology, anesthesiology, radiology and emergency services, and laparoscopic surgery. Super-specialty departments include cardiothoracic, neurology, nephrology, pulmonology, gastroenterology, endocrinology, and neurosurgery. The medical college is provided with the most advanced level for all super-specialty units and colleges for medical, dental, and nursing courses.

Cardiology

Interventional Cardiology / Cardiac Surgery Unit

Azeezia Cardiology
Comprehensive Chest Pain Assessment Center 24x7
Advanced Cardiac Care for Acute Coronary Syndromes 24x7
24x7 New State of art Cardiac Catheterization Laboratory
Coronary Angiography
Elective Angioplasty
Primary Angioplasty
Arrhythmia Management
Temporary and Permanent Cardiac Pacing
ICD Implantation
Azeezia Cardiac Surgery               
Coronary Bypass Surgery
Valve Replacements Surgery
Surgery for Cardiac Tumor Surgery
Septal Defect Closure Surgery
Aorto - Femorol & Femoro Popliteal Bypass Surgery
Embolectomy Procedures Surgery

Dermatology

Azeezia Laser Clinic

Unwanted Hair Removal
Mole Removal
Tattoo Removal
Scars
Acne Scars
Chickenpox Scars
Stretch Marks
Skin Tightening
Skin Whitening
Facial Rejuvenation

Vitiligo Surgery

Melanocyte Grafting
Punch Grafting
Tattoo

Procedures
Electrocautery
Chemical Peeling
Cryotherapy
Dermaroller
Microdermabrasion
PRP
Intralesional Injections
Botox and Fillers

Diagnostic Tests
Skin Biopsy
Food Allergy Test
Patch Test

Azeezia Medical College is sanctioned with MD General medicine 4 seats, MD Dermatology 1 seat, MS Surgery 2 seat, MD Anesthesiology 2 seats, MS Orthopaedic 2 seats, MS Ophthalmology 1 seat, MD Pharmacology 1 seat for the academic year 2015 - 16.

Azeezia Medical College Hospital

Azeezia Medical College Hospital is a 500-bed tertiary care teaching hospital with multi-specialty and super specialty disciplines of the ever-expanding medical horizon students .

See also

 List of medical colleges in India
 AIIMS
 JIPMER
 PGIMER Chandigarh
 CMC Vellore
 Government Medical College, Thiruvananthapuram

References

Medical colleges in Kollam
Colleges affiliated with the Kerala University of Health Sciences
2008 establishments in Kerala
Private medical colleges in India
Educational institutions established in 2008